Vanadium compounds are compounds formed by the element vanadium (V). The chemistry of vanadium is noteworthy for the accessibility of the four adjacent oxidation states 2–5, whereas the chemistry of the other group 5 elements, niobium and tantalum, are somewhat more limited to the +5 oxidation state. In aqueous solution, vanadium forms metal aquo complexes of which the colours are lilac [V(H2O)6]2+, green [V(H2O)6]3+, blue [VO(H2O)5]2+, yellow-orange oxides [VO(H2O)5]3+, the formula for which depends on pH. Vanadium(II) compounds are reducing agents, and vanadium(V) compounds are oxidizing agents. Vanadium(IV) compounds often exist as vanadyl derivatives, which contain the VO2+ center.

Ammonium vanadate(V) (NH4VO3) can be successively reduced with elemental zinc to obtain the different colors of vanadium in these four oxidation states. Lower oxidation states occur in compounds such as V(CO)6,  and substituted derivatives.

Vanadium pentoxide is a commercially important catalyst for the production of sulfuric acid, a reaction that exploits the ability of vanadium oxides to undergo redox reactions.

The vanadium redox battery utilizes all four oxidation states: one electrode uses the +5/+4 couple and the other uses the +3/+2 couple. Conversion of these oxidation states is illustrated by the reduction of a strongly acidic solution of a vanadium(V) compound with zinc dust or amalgam. The initial yellow color characteristic of the pervanadyl ion [VO2(H2O)4]+ is replaced by the blue color of [VO(H2O)5]2+, followed by the green color of [V(H2O)6]3+ and then the violet color of [V(H2O)6]2+.

Oxyanions 

In aqueous solution, vanadium(V) forms an extensive family of oxyanions as established by 51V NMR spectroscopy. The interrelationships in this family are described by the predominance diagram, which shows at least 11 species, depending on pH and concentration. The tetrahedral orthovanadate ion, is the principal species present at pH 12–14. Similar in size and charge to phosphorus(V), vanadium(V) also parallels its chemistry and crystallography. Orthovanadate V is used in protein crystallography to study the biochemistry of phosphate. Beside that, this anion also has been shown to interact with activity of some specific enzymes. The tetrathiovanadate [VS4]3− is analogous to the orthovanadate ion.

At lower pH values, the monomer [HVO4]2− and dimer [V2O7]4− are formed, with the monomer predominant at vanadium concentration of less than c. 10−2M (pV > 2, where pV is equal to the minus value of the logarithm of the total vanadium concentration/M). The formation of the divanadate ion is analogous to the formation of the dichromate ion. As the pH is reduced, further protonation and condensation to polyvanadates occur: at pH 4-6 [H2VO4]− is predominant at pV greater than ca. 4, while at higher concentrations trimers and tetramers are formed. Between pH 2-4 decavanadate predominates, its formation from orthovanadate is represented by this condensation reaction:
10 [VO4]3− + 24 H+ → [V10O28]6− + 12 H2O

In decavanadate, each V(V) center is surrounded by six oxide ligands. Vanadic acid, H3VO4 exists only at very low concentrations because protonation of the tetrahedral species [H2VO4]− results in the preferential formation of the octahedral [VO2(H2O)4]+ species. In strongly acidic solutions, pH < 2, [VO2(H2O)4]+ is the predominant species, while the oxide V2O5 precipitates from solution at high concentrations. The oxide is formally the acid anhydride of vanadic acid. The structures of many vanadate compounds have been determined by X-ray crystallography.

Vanadium(V) forms various peroxo complexes, most notably in the active site of the vanadium-containing bromoperoxidase enzymes. The species VO(O)2(H2O)4+ is stable in acidic solutions. In alkaline solutions, species with 2, 3 and 4 peroxide groups are known; the last forms violet salts with the formula M3V(O2)4 nH2O (M= Li, Na, etc.), in which the vanadium has an 8-coordinate dodecahedral structure.

Halide derivatives 

Twelve binary halides, compounds with the formula VXn (n=2..5), are known. VI4, VCl5, VBr5, and VI5 do not exist or are extremely unstable. In combination with other reagents, VCl4 is used as a catalyst for polymerization of dienes. Like all binary halides, those of vanadium are Lewis acidic, especially those of V(IV) and V(V). Many of the halides form octahedral complexes with the formula VXnL6−n (X= halide; L= other ligand).

Many vanadium oxyhalides (formula VOmXn) are known. The oxytrichloride and oxytrifluoride (VOCl3 and VOF3) are the most widely studied. Akin to POCl3, they are volatile, adopt tetrahedral structures in the gas phase, and are Lewis acidic.

Coordination compounds 

Complexes of vanadium(II) and (III) are relatively exchange inert and reducing. Those of V(IV) and V(V) are oxidants. Vanadium ion is rather large and some complexes achieve coordination numbers greater than 6, as is the case in [V(CN)7]4−. Oxovanadium(V) also forms 7 coordinate coordination complexes with tetradentate ligands and peroxides and these complexes are used for oxidative brominations and thioether oxidations. The coordination chemistry of V4+ is dominated by the vanadyl center, VO2+, which binds four other ligands strongly and one weakly (the one trans to the vanadyl center). An example is vanadyl acetylacetonate (V(O)(O2C5H7)2). In this complex, the vanadium is 5-coordinate, distorted square pyramidal, meaning that a sixth ligand, such as pyridine, may be attached, though the association constant of this process is small. Many 5-coordinate vanadyl complexes have a trigonal bipyramidal geometry, such as VOCl2(NMe3)2. The coordination chemistry of V5+ is dominated by the relatively stable dioxovanadium coordination complexes which are often formed by aerial oxidation of the vanadium(IV) precursors indicating the stability of the +5 oxidation state and ease of interconversion between the +4 and +5 states.

Organometallic compounds 

Organovanadium chemistry is the chemistry of organometallic compounds containing a carbon (C) to vanadium (V) chemical bond. Organovanadium compounds find only minor use as reagents in organic synthesis but are significant for polymer chemistry as catalysts. Vanadocene dichloride is a versatile starting reagent and has applications in organic chemistry. Vanadium carbonyl, V(CO)6, is a rare example of a paramagnetic metal carbonyl. Reduction yields V (isoelectronic with Cr(CO)6), which may be further reduced with sodium in liquid ammonia to yield V (isoelectronic with Fe(CO)5).

Vanadocene is the lightest transition metal metallocene that is isolable at room temperature. Vanadocene reacts with high pressures of carbon monoxide to give CpV(CO)4. Photolysis of the tetracarbonyl gives Cp2V2(CO)5.

Well-defined vanadium compounds do not appear as catalysts in any commercial process.  However organovanadium species are clearly implicated as catalysts for the production of butadiene-based rubbers.  These catalysts are generated in situ by treating soluble coordination complexes such as vanadium(III) acetylacetonate with organoaluminium activators.

See also 

 Titanium compounds
 Chromium compounds

References 

Chemical compounds by element
Vanadium
Vanadium compounds